Indhar is a clan of the Bhati Rajputs which migrated from Jaisalmer in India over three hundred years ago. The tribe is now scattered in various parts of Sindh and Bahawalpur. Recently a comprehensive Book about Indhar Tribe has been published namely "Kasirul Mulki Indhar Qabila Taarikhi Tanazur mein" (Multi-States Indhar Tribe In Historical Perspective.) by Prof. Dr Abdul Waheed Indhar (Director Schools Education Sukkur Region, Sukkur.) and (late) Ustad Muhammad Hasan Mushtaq Indhar Published By Bhong Publications Under the Supervision of Raees Wazir Ahmed Indhar.

The new book of Indhar Qabila is
"Kasirul Mulki Indhar Qabila Taarikhi Tanazur mein".

Sindhi tribes
Sindhi tribes in India